Feakle GAA is a Gaelic Athletic Association club based in Feakle, County Clare, Ireland. The club is primarily concerned with the game of hurling.

Major honours
 Clare Senior Hurling Championship (6): 1935, 1938, 1939, 1940, 1944, 1988
 Munster Intermediate Club Hurling Championship Runners-Up: 2018
 Clare Intermediate Hurling Championship (4): 1930, 1973, 2014, 2018 
 Clare Junior A Hurling Championship (2): 1928, 1953 (as Bauroe)
 Clare Hurling League Div.1 (Clare Cup) (?): 1988, 2021 
 Clare Under-21 A Hurling Championship (5): 1982, 1983, 1984, 1985, 2017 (with Killanena)

Notable players
 Séamus Durack
 Ger Loughnane

External links
Feakle GAA on Facebook

Gaelic games clubs in County Clare
Hurling clubs in County Clare